The following is a list of Michigan State Historic Sites in Cheboygan County, Michigan. Sites marked with a dagger (†) are also listed on the National Register of Historic Places in Cheboygan County, Michigan.


Current listings

See also
 National Register of Historic Places listings in Cheboygan County, Michigan

Sources
 Historic Sites Online – Cheboygan County. Michigan State Housing Developmental Authority. Accessed January 23, 2011.

References

Cheboygan County
State Historic Sites
Tourist attractions in Cheboygan County, Michigan